Targuist (Tarifit: Targist, ⵜⴰⵔⴳⵉⵙⵜ; Arabic: تارجيست) is a town in Al Hoceïma Province, Tanger-Tetouan-Al Hoceima, Morocco. According to the 2004 census, Targuist has a population of 11,560.

References

Populated places in Al Hoceïma Province
Municipalities of Morocco